Leendert Hasenbosch, (probably end of 1725) was a Dutch employee of the Dutch East India Company (commonly abbreviated to VOC) who was marooned on (at the time uninhabited) Ascension Island in the South Atlantic Ocean, as a punishment for sodomy. He wrote a diary until his presumed death.

Early life 
Leendert Hasenbosch was likely born in The Hague, Holland in 1695. Around the year 1709 his father, a widower, moved himself and his three daughters to Batavia in the Dutch East Indies (modern Indonesia) while Leendert stayed in Holland. On 17 January 1714, Hasenbosch became a soldier of the VOC and boarded the flute-ship  in Enkhuizen bound for Batavia where he served for about a year. From 1715 to 1720 he served in Cochin in India, a Dutch possession at the time. In 1720 he returned to Batavia and was promoted to corporal. He later became a military writer, responsible for small-scale bookkeeping. In 1724, he took a position aboard a VOC ship as the ship's bookkeeper. On 17 April 1725, Hasenbosch was convicted of sodomy following the ship's compulsory stop in Cape Town. On 5 May 1725, he was set ashore on Ascension Island as punishment.

Castaway life 
During his time as a castaway, Hasenbosch kept a diary. He began with a tent, a month's worth of water, some seeds, instruments, prayer books, clothing, and writing materials. He searched the barren island for water. Although he found water various times, it was never in consistent supply and during a prolonged period of drought, he began drinking the blood of green turtles and seabirds, as well as his own urine, water found inside the bodies of dead turtles, and even the urine inside the bladders of those turtles. He likely died of thirst after about six months.

A similar punishment was meted out two years later to two boys from the Dutch East India Company ship the Zeewijk, shipwrecked off the west coast of Australia. Found guilty of sodomy, the boys were marooned on separate islands of the Mangrove Group of Houtman Abrolhos, and left to die.

Ascension Island does have two sources of fresh water: a strong water spring in the high interior of the island (in what is now called Breakneck Valley), and a much smaller water source named Dampier's Drip.

The legend 
In January 1726 British sailors from the ship James and Mary discovered the castaway's tent and belongings, including the diary in Dutch. The British concluded that a Dutchman had been set ashore as a punishment for sodomy. They did not find a skeleton but they believed that the man had died of thirst. The diary was taken back to Britain.

In 1726 the translated diary was first published under the title Sodomy Punish'd. In 1728 another version, entitled An Authentick Relation, was published.  The version of 1726 mentions the name of the castaway, misspelled as "Leondert Hussenlosch" but the version of 1728 states that the man's name is unknown. The qualities of both translations are uncertain since the original diary has been lost. Apart from entries about desperate searches for water and firewood, a few entries mention the man's act of sodomy. A few entries can be interpreted as reflections of a guilty conscience, including the apparitions of demons and former friends and acquaintances. In 1730 another version was published under the title The Just Vengeance of Heaven Exemplify'd. This version contains many extra anti-sodomy passages as well as many extra demons harassing the castaway. The publisher also wrote that the castaway's skeleton would have been found alongside the diary – which never happened.

In 1976, American author Peter Agnos published The Queer Dutchman, a fictionalised account based on the version of 1730. Many authors about sodomy, Ascension Island, or castaway stories read either the version of 1730 or the version of 1976 and decided to include parts in their own publications, not realising they were quoting from a fake story.

As late as 1988, recountings of the stories of castaways in English still claimed his name was unknown.

In 2002 a Dutch book Een Hollandse Robinson Crusoë was published, written by the Dutch historian Michiel Koolbergen (1953–2002) after he had done many years of research in Dutch and British archives; Koolbergen died before its publication. Koolbergen had identified the castaway as 'Leendert Hasenbosch' by his work in archives; Koolbergen was aware of all English versions of the diary except that of 1726. Koolbergen's book also contained the relevant texts in the logs of the two British ships whose crews had found the diary in January 1726.

In 2006 the full story was – with the support of Koolbergen's family and publisher – published by Alex Ritsema, with the book A Dutch Castaway on Ascension Island in 1725; a second, revised edition was printed in 2010.

See also
 Utrecht sodomy trials
 Zeewijk shipwreck

References 

General
Michiel Koolbergen, Een Hollandse Robinson Crusoë, 2002
Alex Ritsema, A Dutch Castaway on Ascension Island in 1725 , 2010

1695 births
1725 deaths
Castaways
People from Ascension Island
Dutch sailors
Dutch LGBT people
18th-century LGBT people
People convicted of sodomy
Criminals from The Hague
LGBT in Saint Helena, Ascension and Tristan da Cunha
LGBT history in the Netherlands